Andy Redmayne (born 26 June 1992 in Glasgow , Scotland) is a Scotland Club XV international rugby union player  at the  Lock position. He can also play Flanker.

Rugby Union career

Amateur career

Completing a degree in English at University in Dundee, Redmayne played for the Dundee High School Former Pupils Rugby Club; Dundee HSFP.

Professional career

Redmayne secured an Elite Development Programme position at the Glasgow Warriors in 2013 and 2014  This meant he could continue playing for Glasgow Hawks whilst training and challenging for a place at the Warriors.

He played for Glasgow Warriors in their 2013-14 pre-season friendly against Aberdeen GSFP RFC.

International career

Redmayne was to be capped by Scotland for the under 18s  and capped by the under 20s. He scored a try for the Under 20s against Australia in the 2012 Junior World Championships in Cape Town.

Redmayne was capped by the Scotland Club XV side in 2013.

References

External links 
Hawks biography

1996 births
Living people
Alumni of the University of Dundee
Rugby union players from Glasgow
Scottish rugby union players
Glasgow Hawks players
Dundee HSFP players
Glasgow Warriors players
Scotland Club XV international rugby union players
Rugby union locks
Rugby union flankers